Unsaturated glucuronyl hydrolase may refer to:

 Gellan tetrasaccharide unsaturated glucuronyl hydrolase, an enzyme
 Unsaturated chondroitin disaccharide hydrolase, an enzyme